The Hunters may refer to:

In film
The Hunters (1957 film), an anthropological film directed by Robert Gardner and John Marshall
The Hunters (1958 film), an adaptation of the James Salter novel, starring Robert Mitchum and Robert Wagner
The Hunters (1977 film), a Greek film
The Hunters (1996 film), a Swedish thriller directed by Kjell Sundvall
The Hunters (2011 film), a French film
The Hunters (2013 film), an American film

In literature
The Hunters (novel), a 1956 semi-autobiographical novel by James Salter about U.S. Air Force pilots in the Korean War
The Hunters (2001 book), two novellas by American author Claire Messud
The Hunters (Brotherband), the third novel in the Brotherband series by John Flanagan
The Hunters (2013 book), a novel by American author Chris Kuzneski
The Hunters, a series of novels by American author Chris Kuzneski

In music
The Hunters (band), a punk rock band from Quebec, Canada
The Hunters (instrumental band), a 1960s instrumental band from Cheshunt, Hertfordshire, United Kingdom
The Hunters, a band name under which Scorpions released their single "Fuchs geh' voran"

Other
"The Hunters" (The Twilight Zone), an episode of the television series The New Twilight Zone

See also

 The Hunter (disambiguation)
 Hunters (disambiguation)
 Hunter (disambiguation)